Harmony is a borough in Butler County, Pennsylvania, United States. The population was 890 at the 2010 census.

Geography
Harmony is located in southwestern Butler County, along the northeastern border of the borough of Zelienople. It is in the valley of Connoquenessing Creek, a tributary of the Beaver River.

Interstate 79 passes just east of the borough, with access from exits 87 and 88. Pennsylvania Route 68 passes through the borough, just south of the downtown and leads west into Zelienople and east  to Butler, the county seat.

Demographics

As of the census of 2000, there were 937 people, 409 households, and 267 families residing in the borough. The population density was 2,468.0 people per square mile (952.0/km²). There were 434 housing units at an average density of 1,143.1 per square mile (441.0/km²). The racial makeup of the borough was 99.15% White, 0.53% African American, 0.21% Native American, and 0.11% from two or more races. Hispanic or Latino of any race were 0.64% of the population.

There were 409 households, out of which 23.7% had children under the age of 18 living with them, 54.3% were married couples living together, 6.8% had a female householder with no husband present, and 34.5% were non-families. 27.9% of all households were made up of individuals, and 10.0% had someone living alone who was 65 years of age or older. The average household size was 2.29 and the average family size was 2.82.

In the borough the population was spread out, with 19.9% under the age of 18, 7.0% from 18 to 24, 30.2% from 25 to 44, 26.4% from 45 to 64, and 16.5% who were 65 years of age or older. The median age was 41 years. For every 100 females, there were 94.0 males. For every 100 females age 18 and over, there were 92.6 males.

The median income for a household in the borough was $40,833, and the median income for a family was $47,411. Males had a median income of $36,875 versus $25,357 for females. The per capita income for the borough was $21,693. About 3.1% of families and 4.5% of the population were below the poverty line, including 8.0% of those under age 18 and 5.7% of those age 65 or over.

History
In December 1753, George Washington and Christopher Gist came through the area. They were shot at somewhere between present-day Evans City and Ellwood City (the exact location is unknown), through a region above the forks of the Ohio known as Mutheringtown or "Murdering Town". In 2003, the borough commemorated the event as part of the 250th Anniversary Commemoration of the French and Indian War.
 
Harmony was founded by the pietist Johann Georg Rapp and his Harmony Society in 1804. George Rapp came to America from Württemberg, Germany, in 1803 in search of land for his followers that was free from the religious persecution they faced in Germany. He was searching for a place for his followers to worship, farm and put into effect Rapp's communal religious teachings. In 1804, two groups of Harmonites purchased a tract of land in Butler County, Pennsylvania.

They formally established the Harmony Society in 1805 and lived in Pennsylvania for about 10 years before selling the Harmony property in 1814 to  Abraham Ziegler, a Mennonite, and moving west to Indiana Territory, where they built the town of Harmony on the Wabash River (now New Harmony, Indiana).<ref>William E. Wilson, The Angel and the Serpent: The Story of New Harmony (Bloomington: Indiana University Press, 1964), p. 37–38.</ref> In 1824, they moved back to Pennsylvania, this time to Economy (now Ambridge). The settlements were economically successful, producing many goods in a clothing factory, a sawmill, a tannery, and from their vineyards and distillery. A hotel was also run in Harmony. In Economy, the group aided the construction of the Pittsburgh and Lake Erie Railroad, established the Economy Savings Institution and the Economy Brick Works, and operated the Economy Oil Company, Economy Planing Mill, Economy Lumber Company, and eventually donated some land in Beaver Falls for the construction of Geneva College. In 1869, Mennonite craftsmen built the stone wall around the Harmonite cemetery in Harmony with a unique revolving stone door. The society exerted a major influence on the economic development of western Pennsylvania. But since the group chose to adopt celibacy, they eventually died out when John S. and his wife Susanna C. Duss, the last surviving leaders of Harmony Society, died in 1951.

The Mennonite community in Harmony lasted until around 1904, by which time the town was selling more and more individual plots. Still extant is an old Mennonite meeting house on a hill near Harmony that was built in 1825.

Harmony's history, particularly that of the Harmony Society, is preserved at the Harmony Museum, operated in the town by Historic Harmony, Inc.

On a hill in Harmony, situated above Connoquenessing Creek sits a "seat" of stone (actually a rock formation). This seat was said to be used by Rapp (Rapp's Seat) to watch over the commune and its members in their daily lives. Thanks to local Boy Scout Troop 457 of Zelienople, a set of steps were built leading up to the seat as part of an Eagle Scout project for Christopher Van Arsdale of Harmony.

Popular culture
Harmony is the setting for the film My Bloody Valentine 3D'', but the movie was actually filmed farther east in the boroughs of Ford City and Kittanning.

See also
 Harmony Historic District
 Old Economy Village

References

External links
 Borough of Harmony official website
 John Duss papers, PA State Archives
 Karl Arndt Collection of Harmony Society Materials, PA State Archives
 The Harmony Museum
John M. Tate, Jr. Collection of Notes, Pictures and Documents relating to the Harmony Society, 1806-1930, DAR.1946.02, Darlington Library, Special Collections Department, University of Pittsburgh
http://thecenterofharmony.com/

Utopian communities in Pennsylvania
Radical Pietism
Populated places established in 1804
Pittsburgh metropolitan area
Boroughs in Butler County, Pennsylvania
1804 establishments in Pennsylvania
Intentional communities in the United States